Bipasha Basu Singh Grover (born 7 January 1979) is an Indian actress and former model. Primarily known for her work in Hindi films, she has also appeared in Tamil, Telugu, Bengali and English films. Basu is the recipient of numerous accolades, including one Filmfare Award. Particularly known for her work in the thriller and horror film genres, and for several item numbers, she is frequently cited in the media as a sex symbol and a scream queen.

Born in Delhi and raised in Kolkata, Basu pursued a successful career as a fashion model. She then began receiving offers for film roles, and made her acting debut with the thriller Ajnabee (2001), which won her the Filmfare Award for Best Female Debut. Basu's first leading role was in the horror film Raaz (2002), which earned her a nomination for the Filmfare Award for Best Actress. Her career progressed with a leading role in the erotic thriller Jism (2003) and with her roles in the top-grossing films No Entry (2005) and Dhoom 2 (2006).

Basu's other commercially successful films include the drama Corporate (2006), the comedies Phir Hera Pheri (2006) and All the Best: Fun Begins (2009), the action thriller Race (2008), and the romantic comedy Bachna Ae Haseeno (2008). In the 2010s, she primarily starred in the horror films Raaz 3D (2012), Aatma (2013), Creature 3D (2014) and Alone (2015). This was followed by a hiatus, during which her sole appearance was in the web series Dangerous (2020).

In addition to acting in films, Basu is a fitness enthusiast and has featured in several fitness videos. She has also hosted the horror series Darr Sabko Lagta Hai in 2015. Following a high-profile relationship with actor John Abraham, Basu married actor Karan Singh Grover in 2016, with whom she has one child.

Early life and modelling career
Bipasha Basu was born on 7 January 1979 to a Bengali family in Delhi. Her father, Hirak, is a civil engineer, and her mother, Mamta, is a homemaker. She has one elder sister, Bidisha, and one younger sister, Vijayeta. According to Basu, her name means "dark deep desire", and is also a river's name.

In Delhi, Basu lived at Pamposh Enclave, Nehru Place, till the age of eight and studied at Apeejay High School. Her family then shifted to Kolkata, where she attended Bhavan's Gangabux Kanoria Vidyamandir, located in Bidhannagar. In her school, Basu was appointed as the head girl and was fondly called 'Lady Goonda' due to her short and commanding personality.

In 1996, Basu was spotted at a hotel in Kolkata by the model Mehr Jesia Rampal, who suggested she take up modelling. That year, she participated in and eventually won the Godrej Cinthol Supermodel Contest (organised by Ford), thereby representing India at Ford Models Supermodel of the World contest in Miami. She later appeared in the Calida commercial with her then-boyfriend Dino Morea, which was controversial for picturing them sultrily; she had some protesters outside her house after that. With appearance on several magazine covers, Basu continued to pursue a career in fashion modeling during her late teens, until she became an actress.

Acting career

Debut: 2001–02

One of the judges of the Godrej Cinthol Supermodel Contest in which Basu participated, Vinod Khanna, wanted to launch her alongside his son Akshaye Khanna in Himalay Putra, but she felt she was too young and declined the role, which eventually went to Anjala Zaveri. After returning home, she was convinced by Jaya Bachchan to star opposite her son Abhishek Bachchan in J. P. Dutta's Aakhari Mughal. However, the film was cancelled, and Dutta instead changed the script and made Refugee with Kareena Kapoor. Basu was also offered a role in Refugee opposite Sunil Shetty, which she declined.

In 2001, Basu finally made her debut opposite Akshay Kumar in Vijay Galani's Ajnabee. The film, directed by Abbas–Mustan, was inspired by the American film Consenting Adults. It was a moderate box-office success and attracted unfavorable reviews from critics. However, Basu's performance in a negative role was appreciated by critics and won her the Filmfare Award for Best Female Debut.

In 2002, Basu starred in the year's most successful horror thriller, Raaz. Directed by Vikram Bhatt, it established Basu in the Hindi film industry. Her portrayal of a woman who is pursued by a spirit received positive reviews. One review in The Tribune noted, "... it is Bipasha Basu who steals the show with her fine performance." She was nominated for the Filmfare Award for Best Actress for Raaz. She was appreciated in a supporting role in Sanjay Gadhvi's Mere Yaar Ki Shaadi Hai, a moderate critical and commercial success. However, in David Dhawan's Chor Machaaye Shor, was her first commercial failure. She appeared in a supporting role opposite Mahesh Babu and Lisa Ray in the Telugu film, Takkari Donga. Gunaah, which released later that year, was also a box-office failure. She played the role of a cop who loves a convict and tries to reform him. Derek Elley of Variety observed that Basu was a miscast as the "idealistic cop".

2003–05
In 2003, Basu starred in Pooja Bhatt's erotic thriller film, Jism alongside John Abraham, which was well received by critics and fared well at the box office. She played the role of seductive, ambitious wife of a millionaire who indulges in an extramarital affair with an alcoholic lawyer and plots to kill her husband. The film ranked 92 in the top 100 sexiest movie scenes poll conducted by Channel 4. Film critic Taran Adarsh of Bollywood Hungama commented, "... the real show stealer is Bipasha Basu; her sexy look and seductive deep voice, in contrast with her cold and calculating personality, makes her the most impressive femme fatale since Zeenat Aman and Parveen Babi." She received a Filmfare Best Villain Award nomination for Jism. Her next release, Zameen, failed to make impact among audiences.

Basu had four releases in 2004, all of which performed moderately and drew mixed reviews. She collaborated for the second time with Vikram Bhatt in her first release Aetbaar. She played the role of a young woman who falls in love with a psychopath. Rediff.com noted that "... The characters are not convincing, the plot is not fast-paced or interesting." Her next film was Mani Shankar's Rudraksh, based on the Indian epic Ramayana. The film was a disaster at the box office and was panned by the critics. She then starred in Rakht as a tarot card reader trying to solve a murder mystery. Critic Shruti Bhasin of Planetbollywood wrote, "Bipasha Basu impresses in a different look and role." Her final release that year was Anil Sharma's Madhoshi opposite John Abraham. Her performance of a mentally unstable woman was generally well received.

In 2005, she appeared in the love triangle Barsaat alongside Bobby Deol and Priyanka Chopra. Taran Adarsh commented, "As an actor, she [Bipasha Basu] does show sparks only towards the end." She starred in the Tamil film, Sachein, which was a hit and then in Prakash Jha's Apaharan, which won the National Film Award for Best Screenplay. In this period, she refused to act in art films due to salary problems.

Besides acting, Basu did the video "Tu" for Sonu Nigam's album, Kismat. She made a guest appearance in Jay Sean's music video "Stolen".

2005–09
Basu established herself as a leading actress in 2005 and 2006 with the subsequent success of No Entry, Corporate and Dhoom 2. No Entry grossed 750 million at the box office and was the highest-grossing film of 2005. Basu played the role of a bargirl who acts as wife of two men. She earned a nomination for the Filmfare Award for Best Supporting Actress for the film. 2006 saw her star in four major releases — Phir Hera Pheri, Corporate, Omkara and Dhoom 2 — performing well critically and commercially. Phir Hera Pheri became the ninth highest-grossing film of the year. She was featured opposite Akshay Kumar in a significant role of a con woman who steals 10 million from the protagonists. In Madhur Bhandarkar's Corporate, she gave up her glamorous look for the role of a businesswoman who has no qualms in taking advantage of her sexuality to con the CEO of a rival company. Her performance received praise from critics and she earned her second nomination for the Filmfare Award for Best Actress for the film.

In Vishal Bharadwaj's adaptation of Othello, Omkara, Basu played the role of Bianca and was a cameo. She caught the attention of public with her dance number "Beedi", which was highly popular in India and overseas. Critic Rajeev Masand of CNN-IBN wrote, "... Bipasha Basu is brought in to lend oomph and she succeeds in doing just that." Basu became the talk of the town for donning a bikini in Aditya Chopra's Dhoom 2. She reportedly ate only oranges for three days and trained hard to shoot the scene. Nikhat Kazmi of The Times of India commented, "Aah Bipasha! Looks great, brings back the bikini to Bollywood, and gently slips into the shadows as a pretty accessory."

In 2007, Ronnie Screwvala's Dhan Dhana Dhan Goal performed below average at the box-office. The song picturised on John Abraham and Basu, "Billo Rani", became quite popular and earned her the nickname "Billo Rani", though equal credit must be given to Omkara in which her name was Billo Chamanbahar. In 2008, she teamed up once again with Abbas–Mustan for Race. She played the role of Sonia who is stuck in a love-triangle between two brothers (played by Saif Ali Khan and Akshaye Khanna) and, through the course, she murders one of them. The film grossed 680 million at the box office and was the fourth-biggest hit that year in India; it performed good enough overseas as well. Her performance was appreciated by critics with Taran Adarsh citing it as "her best work so far. She's superb." Basu's work in Siddharth Anand's Bachna Ae Haseeno as a successful supermodel who finds it hard to forgive her ex-lover for betraying her earned her a second nomination for the Filmfare Award for Best Supporting Actress; the film also proved to be a commercial success. She completed 2008 by appearing during the song "Phir Milenge Chalte Chalte" in Rab Ne Bana Di Jodi.

Her first release in 2009, Aa Dekhen Zara failed to do well at the box office. Rohit Shetty's All The Best: Fun Begins performed well and her comic role was appreciated by fans. Later that year, Basu surprised everybody with Rituparno Ghosh's Bengali film, Shob Charitro Kalponik. "I love saris and I'm wearing a lot of them in Ritu's film," she said. She gave up her glamorous look and was praised by critics for her performance. Critic Subhash K. Jha spoke high of her. He said, "Bipasha [Basu] pulls out all stops to deliver her career's best performance. Her moments of anguish before and after her screen-husband's death are expressed in tones of cathartic conviction that we never knew existed within Bipasha." He also compared her with the multiple-award-winning actress, Shabana Azmi, commenting that Basu's anguished portrayal of bereavement can be equalled by Azmi only.

Recent work: 2010–present

With the 2010 film Pankh, Basu returned as an imaginary character who exists in the protagonist's mind. She was then featured as a Kashmiri girl in Rahul Dholakia's Lamhaa, which explored socio-political problems in Kashmir. Principal photography of Lamhaa was disrupted many times by the locals due to the controversial theme. During the shooting of Lamhaa, she left the sets at Anantnag and headed back to Mumbai citing she was afraid of the crowd there. Producer Bunty Walia thought of replacing her with Vidya Balan, but she returned for the shoot later with necessary security arrangements. NDTV Movies wrote, "Bipasha sinks herself into her character imparting a dramatic resonance into the role without resorting to stock expressions. The sequence where she gets mauled by militant women is as traumatic to watch as it must have been for Bipasha to shoot." Basu then appeared as the wife of a ruthless cop in Priyadarshan's Aakrosh who helps the police with investigation on honour killings in their village. She met with mixed reviews for the film. Nikhat Kazmi of The Times of India commented, "Bipasha actually doesn't have much to do and does seem to be miscast as the much-abused, bruised and battered wife of Paresh Rawal".

Her only release in 2011 was Dum Maaro Dum, which performed reasonably well at the box office and met with good reviews from critics. Talking of the film, she said, "My next release is Dum Maaro Dum, in which I play a lively, colourful, happy-go-lucky girl called Zoey, who is the representation of Goa as we see it." Basu collaborated with Abbas–Mustan for the third time in Players, which became the first release of 2012. The film was an official remake of The Italian Job. Players was heavily compared to The Italian Job and was criticised for its execution and performances, including that of Basu.

Her next release was Raaz 3, a supernatural horror thriller directed by Vikram Bhatt, upon release met with favourable response and emerging as a box office success after a period of relatively low phase for Basu. Her performance in the film garnered acclaim from critics with Subhash K. Jha of IANS saying, "It's Bipasha who holds together the feverish proceedings. She delivers a full-bodied gutsy performance."

After appearing in a guest appearance in Race 2, where she reprised her role from the prequel, Basu was seen in the horror film Aatma which was directed by Suparn Verma and produced by Kumar Mangat and Abhishek Pathak. She received mixed reviews for the movie. Bipasha performed live alongside Atif Aslam, Shaan & Malaika Arora Khan for the first time in series of concerts in Birmingham & London in the summer 2013.

In 2014 Bipasha Basu was seen on numerous roles in different types of movies. She appeared in Humshakals, a comedy movie directed by Sajid Khan opposite Saif Ali Khan. Humshakals was a box office disaster. She even didn't participate in the film's promotions because she was "extremely disturbed by the end result" and stated, "Humshakals was the worst experience of my life". She was also seen in a horror film Creature 3D, which was again a box office failure. Basu had completed work on her first English film, Roland Joffé's epic drama The Lovers in which she portrayed a Maratha warrior. The film was released on 13 March 2015. In 2015, Basu featured in Bhushan Patel's romance horror film Alone opposite her future husband Karan Singh Grover. India TV reviewed the movie and wrote that, "With some genuine scary moments and Bipasha-Karan's scorching chemistry, Alone stands apart from numerous horrible horror flicks made in the past." and also stated that, "Bipasha just takes her act to another level." The film performed moderately well at the box office.

As of 2020, Basu is committed to star opposite her husband Karan Singh Grover for the second time in the crime drama web series Dangerous.

Media image 
Basu ranked 8 in The Times of India 50 most desirable women in 2011, ranked 13 in 2012, and ranked 7 in 2013. UK magazine Eastern Eye named her the "Sexiest Woman in Asia" in 2005 and 2007.

Other ventures

Fitness DVD launch

Aside from films, Basu is an advocate of physical fitness. In 2005 she released her first fitness DVD jointly with John Abraham, titled Bollywood Bodies. In 2010 she released her first solo fitness DVD called Love Yourself: Fit & Fabulous You, which emphasised on being strong, healthy, and loving one's self. The DVD consisted of a 60-day routine for weight-loss, including a beginner's workout, an advanced workout and an "easy tone" workout. She was also the brand ambassador of Sugar Free, which helped her promoting the DVD. Hiren Gada, director of Shemaroo Entertainment said, "A celebrity like Bipasha Basu, genuinely believes in staying healthy. She is also passionate about fitness." Basu later launched her second fitness DVD in September 2011 named Break Free, a 30-minute dance routine, and the follow up to Bipasha Basu's first workout video, continuing the Love Yourself series. In January 2014 Bipasha Basu launched her much awaited third instalment of her Love Yourself DVD fitness series, Unleash, an advanced training routine that includes plyometrics and focuses more on power and speed, while strengthening the bones and improving muscle coordination. Later in 2014, many of her fitness workout videos were released for free on distributor Shemaroo Entertainment's health-focussed YouTube channel, Shemaroo Good Health 24/7.

She is also the face of Delhi Marathon, which has been inspired by her interest in fitness.

Personal life

Basu was in a relationship with actor Dino Morea from 1996 to 2002 and a very high-profile one with John Abraham from 2002 to 2011. She briefly dated Harman Baweja, but they broke up in 2014. The same year, Basu met co-star Karan Singh Grover on the sets of Alone and they fell in love. The couple got married on 30 April 2016. In August 2022,  the couple announced that they are expecting their first child. Their daughter, Devi Basu Singh Grover, was born on 12 November 2022.

Filmography

Awards and nominations

References

External links

 
 Bipasha Basu on IMDb 
 
 

1979 births
Living people
Indian film actresses
Indian television actresses
Indian web series actresses
Actresses from Delhi
Actresses from Kolkata
Bengali actresses
Actresses in Hindi cinema
Actresses in Tamil cinema
Actresses in Bengali cinema
Actresses in Telugu cinema
Actresses in Hindi television
Apeejay School alumni
Bharatiya Vidya Bhavan schools alumni
Filmfare Awards winners
International Indian Film Academy Awards winners
Female models from Delhi
Female models from Kolkata
20th-century Bengalis
21st-century Bengalis
20th-century Indian actresses
21st-century Indian actresses